Chenguanying station is a station in Xigu District, Lanzhou, Gansu. Built in 1953, it is a minor station on the Lanzhou–Xinjiang railway, with only one local train per day stopping in each direction. A new station building was constructed together with the construction of the Lanzhou-Zhongchuan Airport Intercity Railway, however the station has not opened as a stop on this route yet.

Metro station
Chenguanying station is also the western terminus of the Lanzhou Metro Line 1. The metro station is located in a separate building a hundred meters east of the railway station.

References

Railway stations in Gansu